Miles Crossing is an unincorporated community in Clatsop County, Oregon, United States.

References

Unincorporated communities in Clatsop County, Oregon
Unincorporated communities in Oregon